The 1973 Tour of the Basque Country was the 13th edition of the Tour of the Basque Country cycle race and was held from 9 April to 13 April 1973. The race started and finished in Eibar. The race was won by Luis Ocaña of the Bic team.

General classification

References

1973
Bas